Wigley may refer to:

Places
Wigley, Derbyshire, England, a place in Derbyshire
Wigley, Hampshire, England, on the River Blackwater
Wigley, Bromfield, Shropshire, England

People
Bob Wigley, English businessman
Dafydd Wigley, Baron Wigley (born 1943), born David Wigley, Welsh politician
George J. Wigley (1825–1866), English journalist and supporter of Catholic causes
Sir Harry Wigley (1913–1980), New Zealand pilot, adventurer and tourism entrepreneur
Jane Wigley (1820–1883), British photographer
Richard E. Wigley (1918–1998), American farmer and politician
Rodolph Wigley (1881–1946), New Zealand tourism pioneer
Steve Wigley (born 1961), English (soccer) football coach and former player
Thomas Francis Wigley (c. 1854–1933), lawyer and horse racing official in South Australia
Thomas Henry Wigley (1825–1895), South Australian farmer then New Zealand politician
Tom Wigley, Australian climate scientist
William Wigley (1826–1890), South Australian yachtsman, mayor and politician